Youcef Chibane (born 23 September 1988) is an Algerian footballer who plays as a forward for NA Hussein Dey.

References

External links

1988 births
Living people
Association football forwards
Algerian footballers
Algerian expatriate footballers
RC Kouba players
USM El Harrach players
JS Kabylie players
USM Bel Abbès players
JSM Béjaïa players
DRB Tadjenanet players
ES Sétif players
MC Oran players
Al-Qaisumah FC players
Algerian expatriate sportspeople in Saudi Arabia
Expatriate footballers in Saudi Arabia
Saudi First Division League players
21st-century Algerian people